Milli Al-Ameen College for Girls, is an undergraduate women's college in Kolkata, West Bengal, India. It is affiliated with the University of Calcutta.

Departments

Arts and Commerce
Bengali
English
Urdu
Islamic History and Culture
History
Geography
Political Science
Education
Commerce

See also 
List of colleges affiliated to the University of Calcutta
Education in India
Education in West Bengal

References

External links

University of Calcutta affiliates
Universities and colleges in Kolkata
Women's universities and colleges in West Bengal
Educational institutions established in 1992
1992 establishments in West Bengal